John Tukey (1915–2000) was an American mathematician.

Tukey may also refer to:
 Francis Tukey (1814–1867), American politician
 Tukey Island, one of the Joubin Islands, Antarctica
 Tukey's Bridge, Portland, Maine
 Tukey's test (disambiguation)

See also
 
 Tuke (disambiguation)
 Turkey (disambiguation)